The Things We Think We're Missing is the second studio album by American band Balance and Composure, released on September 9, 2013.

Track listing

Chart positions

References 

2013 albums
Balance and Composure albums
Albums produced by Will Yip